Crecy, or the Battle of Crécy, was a battle between the English and French in 1346.

Crecy may also refer to:

Places
 Aunay-sous-Crécy, a commune in France
 Crécy-en-Ponthieu, a commune in France
 Crécy-sur-Serre, a commune in France 
 Estrées-lès-Crécy, a commune in France
 Montigny-sur-Crécy, a commune in France 
 Crécy-la-Chapelle, a commune in France
 Canton of Crécy-la-Chapelle, a canton in France
 Canton of Crécy-en-Ponthieu, a canton in France
 Canton of Crécy-sur-Serre, a canton in France
 Crécy-la-Chapelle station, a train station in France
 Crecy Hill, Tackley, Oxfordshire, England, UK; a hill

People
 Louis de Verjus, comte de Crécy (1629–1709), a French politician and diplomat

People with the surname
 Étienne de Crécy  (born 1969), French DJ and producer
 Hugh of Crécy (died 1147), French rebel and assassin
 Sgt. Warren G. H. Crecy, WWII U.S. tank commander

Fictional characters
 Odette De Crecy, a character from the novel In Search of Lost Time (À la recherche du temps perdu) by Marcel Proust

Other uses
 Crécy (comics), a graphic novel set during the Crécy campaign
 Rolls-Royce Crecy, an aero engine
 Vickers Wellington or Crecy, a bomber
 Battle of Crécy (1346) during the Hundred Years War
 Crécy campaign, the English army campaign which culminated in the Battle of Crécy

See also

Henry Crécy Yarrow (1840–1928), U.S. biologist
Cressey (disambiguation)
Cressy (disambiguation)